Dorcadion molitor is a species of beetle in the family Cerambycidae. It was described by Johan Christian Fabricius in 1775, originally under the genus Lamia. It is known from France and Spain.

Subspecies
 Dorcadion molitor molitor (Fabricius, 1775)
 Dorcadion molitor navasi Escalera, 1900

See also 
Dorcadion

References

molitor
Beetles described in 1775
Taxa named by Johan Christian Fabricius